Nikola Fraňková and Anastasia Pavlyuchenkova were the defending champions, having won the previous event in 2008, however both players chose not to participate.

Viktorija Golubic and Aliaksandra Sasnovich won the title, defeating Stéphanie Foretz and Ana Vrljić in the final, 6–4, 7–5.

Seeds

Draw

References 
 Main Draw on ITF site

Ladies Neva Cup - Doubles
St. Petersburg Ladies' Trophy